Fedyakovo is the name of several rural localities in Russia:
Fedyakovo, Nizhny Novgorod Oblast, a selo in Nizhny Novgorod Oblast
Fedyakovo, Pskov Oblast, a village in Pskov Oblast
Fedyakovo, name of several other rural localities